Vitaliy Mykolayovych Oluiko (born 2 January 1961, Yampil, Ukraine) is a Ukrainian politician, former member of the Verkhovna Rada (Ukraine's national parliament).

Soon after graduating the university, in 1983-1985 he worked on leading positions at local kolkhoz in Yampil. In 1985-1987 he headed the Komsomol of Ukraine in Bilohiria Raion and in 1987-1991 among the leaders of Khmelnytskyi Oblast. Following the dissolution of the Soviet Union, in 1991-1992 Oluiko headed the coordination council of Podolia Youth League.

In 1992-2000 he worked on leading positions at local government of Khmelnytskyi Oblast.

In 2002-2006 Oluiko was a member of the Verkhovna Rada representing People's Democratic Party within the For United Ukraine! bloc.

While being a parliamentary, in 2005 he served as a Governor of Khmelnytskyi Oblast.

In the 2006 and 2007 Ukrainian parliamentary election Oluiko failed to get reelected to parliament as a candidate of Lytvyn Bloc.

In the 2012 Ukrainian parliamentary election Oluiko failed again to return to parliament as a candidate for Party of Regions in (first-past-the-post) single-member district number 189 located around Krasyliv. He gained second place with 18.62% of the votes, losing to the candidate of Svoboda Ihor Sabii who gained 19.40%.

Oluiko last attempt to return to the national parliament in the 2014 Ukrainian parliamentary election was again unsuccessful as his party Strong Ukraine failed to clear the 5% election threshold (it got 3.11% of the votes) and Oluiko was placed 46th on its national list (the party did win one constituency seat and thus one parliamentary seat).

References

External links
 Profile at the Official Ukraine Today portal

1961 births
Living people
People from Khmelnytskyi Oblast
Podilskyi State Agro-Technical University alumni
Komsomol of Ukraine members
Governors of Khmelnytskyi Oblast
Fourth convocation members of the Verkhovna Rada
People's Democratic Party (Ukraine) politicians
Recipients of the Honorary Diploma of the Cabinet of Ministers of Ukraine